Toyohira may refer to:

Toyohira, Hiroshima
Toyohira River
Toyohira-ku, Sapporo